NanoAvionics Corp is an advanced small satellite bus manufacturer and mission integrator founded as a spin-off from Vilnius University, Lithuania in 2014.

Overview 
The company specializes in production of small satellite buses and development of commercial and scientific satellite missions: mission design, hardware assembly, integration and verification, testing campaigns, standardized products (highly integrated communication, on-board computer, attitude determination and control systems, solar panels, structural elements), modular chemical propulsion systems. It markets four multipurpose satellite buses: M16P, M12P, M6P and M3P made to confirm to 16U, 12U, 6U and 3U Cubesat standards correspondingly. Also, it offers modular microsatellite bus MP42 (up to 115 kg).

In 2018, AST & Science acquired a controlling interest in NanoAvionics, and its CEO Abel Avellan became chairman of the board.

In 2022, Kongsberg Gruppen acquired 77 per cent of the company. AST & Science divested all its shares, while the management of NanoAvionics retained 23 per cent.

Implemented missions 
LituanicaSAT-1 is one of the two first Lithuanian satellites launched from the Wallops Flight Facility by Antares rocket, with the International Space Station (ISS) resupply cargo ship Cygnus 2 in January 2014.
LituanicaSAT-2 is the second mission of NanoAvionics intended for EU project "QB50" led by the Von Karman Institute (VKI) for fluid dynamics (Belgium), under the European Commission's research and innovation program FP7 (2007-2013). LituanicaSAT-2 was developed by NanoAvionics under the contract with Vilnius University. LituanicaSAT-2 is consisting of three main modules: a science unit with the FIPEX (Flux-Φ-Probe Experiment) sensor for "QB50", a functional unit with NanoAvionics Command and Service module plus power unit and an experimental unit with the “green” propulsion system.
Blue Walker 1 and M6P are two successful orbital missions based on NanoAvionics M6P nanosatellite bus. The first nanosatellite “Blue Walker 1” is a 6U satellite bus that was first of a series of satellites to test AST & Science technologies in space. The second nanosatellite “M6P” was a mission that hosted payloads from two companies specializing in Internet of Things (IoT) communication. Both were launched 1 April 2019 aboard a PSLV-QL rocket.
LacunaSat-3 - successful mission based on M3P nano satellite bus. Nano satellite was launched in 2020 September on Soyuz-2-1b rocket and demonstrated IoT technologies.
R2 - NanoAvionics ride-share mission based on M6P nano satellite bus. Nanosatellite was launched in 2020 November from India on Polar Satellite Launch Vehicle C-49.
Charlie - successful IoT/M2M mission based on M6P nano satellite bus. Nano satellite was launched in 2021 January as a part of the first SpaceX SmallSat rideshare program called Transporter-1 (spaceflight). It was launched on a Falcon 9 Block 5 rocket from Cape Canaveral Space Force Station, the United States. 
D2/AtlaCom-1 ride-share mission based on M6P nano satellite bus. It carried payloads from the "HyperActive" consortium comprising Dragonfly Aerospace, Space JLTZ and NanoAvionics itself, as well as an electric propulsion demonstration by Accion Systems. Nanosatellite was launched on 30 June 2021 as part of SpaceX Transporter-2 mission on a Falcon 9 Block 5 rocket from Cape Canaveral Space Force Station.
MP42/Tiger-3 rideshare mission using for the first time the MP42 microsatellite bus, which is also their largest built satellite to date. It carries a cell tower for QQ Technology's 5G constellation and the RW500 reaction wheel for attitude control from VEOWARE. It was launched on 1 April 2022 on a Falcon 9 Block 5 rocket as part of SpaceX's Transporter-4 mission.
Gama Alpha - successful mission based on the M6P nanosatellite bus to demonstrate the commercial solar sail of the French space startup Gama. The sail has a diameter of 73.3 m and it represents Europe's first solar sail mission. It was launched on 3 January 2023 as part of SpaceX's Transporter-6 mission.
MilSpace2 - successful mission consisting of two nanosatellites (Birkeland and Huygens) based on the M6P bus and built for a consortium of the Dutch Royal NLR and TNO and the Norwegian FFI. The two nanosatellites will work to detect, classify, and accurately geolocate radio frequency signals and will fly at a close proximity of 20 kilometres. They were launched on 3 January 2023 as part of SpaceX's Transporter-6 mission.

The NanoAvionics core engineering team has also implemented over 85 successful commercial missions and sold their products and services to over 40 countries.

Research and development 
NanoAvionics Corp has been awarded a grant from EU's Horizon 2020 and ESA (among others) for developing a global IoT constellation-as-a-service aimed at IoT/M2M communication providers.

NanoAvionics Corp has also been awarded a grant from EC under research and innovation program "Horizon2020" for the project "Enabling  Propulsion System for Small Satellites (EPSS) Market". The purpose of this project is to carry out a feasibility study for proposed propulsion system market potential and develop a business model for product development. Suggested new propulsion system is important for small satellite market suggesting green chemical propulsion system which makes use of an environmentally friendly propellant, and is a low cost integral plug and play design offering great economic advantages to the growing small satellite market, which presently suffers from the unavailability of a low cost, high performance propulsion solution. It is expected that the new technology will improve the precision and prolong the orbit lifetime of a satellite up to 5x: from 3–4 months up till 15-18.

NanoAvionics Corp, together with the National Centre for Physical Sciences and Technology (FTMC), Lithuania, also carried out a project on innovative catalytic materials for miniaturized monopropellant thruster systems.

References 

Aerospace companies of Europe
Companies based in Vilnius
CubeSats
2014 establishments in Lithuania
2022 mergers and acquisitions